This list of University of South Africa people includes notable alumni, faculty, administrators, and affiliates of the University of South Africa.

Notable alumni and faculty 

 Jean-Bertrand Aristide, Haitian politician, received a Doctor of Literature and Philosophy (D.Litt. et Phil.) in African Languages in 2007
 Walter Battiss, South African abstract painter, received a Bachelor of Fine Arts in 1942 Honorary and an honorary Doctor of Literature and Philosophy (D.Litt. et Phil. Honoris Causa) in 1973
 Dianne Lynne Bevelander, South African academic and activist
 Edwin Cameron, judge of the Constitutional Court of South Africa, received a Bachelor of Laws (LL.B. Cum Laude) in 1981
 Ergun Caner, Swedish Evangelical and Southern Baptist apologist, received a Doctor of Theology (D.Th.) in 2000
 Lazarus M. Chakwera, received a Master of Theology in 1991, Head of State, Republic of Malawi
 Alan Clark, former CEO of SABMiller, received a Doctor of Literature and Philosophy in Psychology
 Johan Froneman, judge of the Constitutional Court of South Africa, received a Bachelor of Laws (LL.B.) in 1977
 King George V, received an Honorary Doctor of Laws (LL.D. Honoris Causa) in 1899, two years prior to becoming Chancellor of the university
 Denis Goldberg, anti-apartheid activist: Public Administration, Library Science, History and Geography, between 1965 and 1985.
 Pravin Gordhan, former South African Minister of Finance, received an Honorary Doctor of Commerce (D.Com. Honoris Causa) in 2007
 Elson Kaseke, the former Solicitor-General of Belize, received a Doctor of Laws (LL.D.) in 2006
 Ahmed Kathrada, former South African politician, received a Bachelor of Arts (B.A.) in Criminology and History in 1968 and a Bachelor of Bibliography (B.Bibl.) in African Politics and Library Science in 1975
 F. W. de Klerk, former State President of South Africa, received an Honorary Doctor of Laws (LL.D. Honoris Causa) in 1995
 Johann Kriegler, judge of the Constitutional Court of South Africa
 Pius Langa, former Chief Justice of South Africa, received a Bachelor of Jurisprudence (B.Iuris) in 1973 and a Bachelor of Laws (LL.B.) in 1976
 Nelson Mandela, former president of the Republic of South Africa, received a Bachelor of Arts (B.A.) in 1942 and a Bachelor of Laws (LL.B.) in 1988
 Gwede Mantashe, South African politician, received a Bachelor of Commerce (B.Com.) in 1997 and a Bachelor of Commerce Honours (B.Com. (Hons)) in 2002
 Trevor Manuel, South African politician, received an Honorary Doctor of Technology (D.Tech. Honoris Causa) in 2002
 Anja Marais, South African sculptor, received a Bachelor of Fine Arts Honour's (B.F.A. (Hons)) in 1998
 Mogoeng Mogoeng, current Chief Justice of South Africa, received a Master of Laws (LL.M.) in 1989
 Dikgang Moseneke, former Deputy Chief Justice of South Africa, received a Bachelor of Arts (B.A.) in English and Political Science, a Bachelor of Jurisprudence (B.Iuris), a Bachelor of Laws (LL.B.), and an Honorary Doctor of Laws (LL.D. Honoris Causa) in 2011
 Peya Mushelenga, Namibian Minister of Rural and Urban Development obtained BA Honours and an MA in International Politics in 1997 and 2009, respectively, and a D Litt et Phil in 2015.
 Bulelani Ngcuka, former Director of Public Prosecutions of South Africa, received a Bachelor of Laws (LL.B.) in 1985
 Georgia Papageorge, South African installation artist, received a Bachelor of Arts (B.A.) in Fine Arts in 1979
 Mark Pilgrim, South African radio and television personality, received a Bachelor of Commerce (B.Com.) in Industrial & Organisational Psychology in 1994
 Cyril Ramaphosa, current president of Republic of South Africa, received a Baccalaureus Procurationis (B.Proc.) in 1981
 Mamphela Ramphele, former South African politician, received a Bachelor of Commerce (B.Com.) in Administration in 1983
 Desmond Tutu, Anglican cleric and theologian known for his work as an anti-apartheid and human rights activist. Winner of the Nobel peace prize. BA 1954
 Justice Raymond Zondo, judge of the Constitutional Court of South Africa, received a Master of Laws (LL.M.) in Commercial Law, a Master of Laws (LL.M.) in Labour Law, and a Master of Laws (LL.M.) in Patent Law
Angelique Rockas actress, producer and activist, creator of Internationalist Theatre London, pioneer of multi-racial and multi-national productions of European classics

Chancellors, vice-chancellors, and principals of the university

Vice-chancellors of the University of the Cape of Good Hope, from 1873 to 1918 

 Langham Dale, 1873 – 1877; 1879 – 1882; 1884 – 1889
 Charles Abercrombie Smith, 1877 – 1879; 1905 – 1911
 Hopkins Badnall, 1882 – 1884
 Charles Thomas Smith, 1889 – 1893
 George Ogilvie, 1893 – 1897
 Thomas Muir, 1897 – 1901
 Ebenezer John Buchanan, 1901 – 1905
 Thomas Walker, 1911 – 1913
 William Ritchie, 1913 – 1916
 Malcolm William Searle, 1916 – 1918

Chancellors of the University of South Africa from 1918 to the present 

 Prince Arthur, Duke of Connaught and Strathearn, 1918 – 1942
 Nicolaas Jacobus de Wet, 1943 – 1951
 Gerhardus Jacobus Maritz, 1951 – 1957
 Francois Jean de Villiers, 1957 – 1977
 Victor Gustav Hiemstra, 1977 – 1987
 vacant 1988
 Theo van Wijk, 1989 – 1990
 Christoph Friedrich Garbers, September 1990 – 2000
 Bernard Ngoepe, 2001–2016
 Thabo Mbeki, 2016 – present

Vice-chancellors of the University of South Africa, 1918 to 1955 

 Willem Jacobus Viljoen, 1918 – 1922
 John Ernest Adamson, 1922 – 1926
 John Daniel Kestell, 1926 – 1928
 Hugh Bryan, 1928 – 1930
 Nicolaas Marais Hoogenhout, 1930 – 1932
 Samuel Henri Pellissier, 1932 – 1934
 Marthinus Christoffel Botha, 1934 -1936
 François Daniël Hugo, 1936 – 1938
 François Stephanus Malan, 1938 – 1940
 Ferdinand Postma, 1940 – 1944
 Alfred Adrian Roberts, 1944 – 1946
 Herman Heinrich Gerhard Kreft, 1946 – 1948
 Albertus Johannes Roux van Rhijn, 1948 – 1952
 Stephanus Petrus Erasmus Boshoff, 1952 – 1955

Principals and vice-chancellors of the University of South Africa, 1953 to the present 

 Andries Jacobus Hendrik Johannes Van der Walt, Principal, 1953 – 1955
 Andries Jacobus Hendrik Johannes Van der Walt, Principal and Vice-Chancellor, 1956
 Samuel Pauw, Principal and Vice-Chancellor, 1956 – 1972
 Theo van Wijk, Principal and Vice-Chancellor, 1972 – 1988
 Jan Casper Gerhardus Janse van Vuuren, Principal and Vice-Chancellor, 1989 – 1993
 Marinus Wiechers, Principal and Vice-Chancellor, 1994 – 1997
 Antony Patrick Melck, Principal and Vice-Chancellor, 1998 (acting) and 1999 – 2001
 Nyameko Barney Pityana, Principal and Vice-Chancellor, 2002 – 2010
 Mandla Makhanya, Principal and Vice-Chancellor, 2011–2021
 Puleng LenkaBula, Principal and Vice-Chancellor, 2021–present

References

External links
 University of South Africa Alumni

Lists of South African people